This is a list of player transfers involving Pro14 rugby union teams between the end of the 2017–18 season and the end of the 2018–19 season.

Benetton

Players In 
 Marco Zanon from  Mogliano
 Iliesa Ratuva Tavuyara from  Waikato
 Derrick Appiah from  London Scottish
 Giuseppe Di Stefano from  Fiamme Oro
 Giovanni Pettinelli from  Calvisano
 Antonio Rizzi from  Petrarca
 Dewaldt Duvenage from 
 Toa Halafihi from  Taranaki

Players Out
 Filippo Filippetto retired
 Marty Banks to  NTT Docomo Red Hurricanes
 Whetu Douglas to  Crusaders
 Matteo Zanusso to  Calvisano
 Francesco Minto to  I Medicei
 Michael Tagicakibau to  Manawatu

Cardiff Blues

Players In
 Dmitri Arhip from  Ospreys
 Jason Harries from  Edinburgh
 Rory Thornton from  Ospreys (season-long loan)
 Samu Manoa from  Toulon
 Liam Belcher from  Dragons
 Tom Williams from  Scarlets

Players Out
 Alex Cuthbert to  Exeter Chiefs
 Damien Welch to  Cross Keys
 Taufa'ao Filise retired
 Sam Warburton retired
 Gethin Jenkins retired
 Samu Manoa released
 Steven Shingler to  Stade Montois

Cheetahs

Players In

  Dian Badenhorst from 
  Aidon Davis from 
  Louis Fouché from  Kubota Spears
 Benhard Janse van Rensburg from 
  Rudy Paige from 
  Sibabalo Qoma from 
 Tian Schoeman from  Bordeaux
 Dries Swanepoel from  Bulls
 Jannes Snyman from  
 Marnus van der Merwe from  Free State Cheetahs
 Boan Venter from 
 Quintin Vorster from 
 Louis Conradie from  
 JP du Preez from  
 Walt Steenkamp from  
 Stephan Malan from  
 Luigy van Jaarsveld from  
 Ruben de Haas from  
 Niell Stannard from  
 Carel-Jan Coetzee from  Free State Cheetahs
 Vuyani Maqina from  Free State Cheetahs
 Adriaan Carelse from  
 Abongile Nonkontwana from 
 Tapiwa Mafura from  
 Sintu Manjezi from 
 Rhyno Smith from 
 Darren Adonis from

Players Out
 Francois Venter to  Worcester Warriors
 Johan Goosen to 
 Uzair Cassiem to  Scarlets
 Clayton Blommetjies to  Scarlets
 Tom Botha to  Ospreys
 Reniel Hugo to  Toyota Verblitz
 Niel Marais to  Yamaha Júbilo
 Clinton Swart to  Toyota Verblitz
 Henco Venter to  Toshiba Brave Lupus
 Carl Wegner to  Toyota Verblitz
 Tertius Kruger to  Southern Kings
 Torsten van Jaarsveld to  Bayonne
 Rynier Bernardo to  Canon Eagles
 Paul Schoeman to  Blue Bulls
 Fred Zeilinga to  Canon Eagles
 AJ Coertzen to  Aurillac
 Ruan van Rensburg to  Southern Kings
 Luther Obi injured
 Jannes Snyman released
 Lihleli Xoli not named
 Louis Conradie released
 Niell Jordaan released
 Stephan Malan released
 Zee Mkhabela released

Connacht

Players In
 Peter Claffey promoted from Academy
 Cillian Gallagher promoted from Academy
 Conán O'Donnell promoted from Academy
 Robin Copeland from  Munster
 Kyle Godwin from  Brumbies
 David Horwitz from  Melbourne Rebels
 Joe Maksymiw from  Leicester Tigers
 Jonny Murphy from  Rotherham Titans
 Colby Fainga'a from  Melbourne Rebels
 Tom Daly from  Leinster (loan)
 Angus Lloyd from  Clontarf
 Stephen Fitzgerald from  Munster (loan)

Players Out
 Jake Heenan to  Bristol Bears
 John Muldoon retired
 Pita Ahki to  Toulouse
 Andrew Deegan to  Western Force
 Naulia Dawai to  Otago
 Stacey Ili to  Hawke's Bay
 JP Cooney retired
 Pat O'Toole to  San Diego Legion
 Andrew Browne retired
 Denis Coulson to  Lansdowne
 Steve Crosbie to  Old Belvedere
 Rory Scholes to  Brive
 Cormac Brennan released

Dragons

Players In
 Jordan Williams from  Bristol Bears
 Rhodri Williams from  Bristol Bears
 Ross Moriarty from  Gloucester
 Rhodri Davies from  Rotherham Titans
 Richard Hibbard from  Gloucester 
 Huw Taylor from  Worcester Warriors
 Josh Lewis from  Bath
 Ryan Bevington from  Bristol Bears
 Aaron Jarvis from  Clermont
 Dafydd Howells from  Ospreys
 Tiaan Loots from  RGC 1404
 Jacob Botica from  RGC 1404
 Rhys Lawrence from  Ealing Trailfinders
 Brandon Nansen from  Stade Francais
 Carwyn Penny from  Gloucester
 Jason Tovey from  Edinburgh

Players Out
 Sarel Pretorius to  Southern Kings
 Phil Price to  Scarlets
 Scott Andrews to  Neath
 Luke Garrett to  Neath
 Adam Hughes retired
 Pat Howard to  Ealing Trailfinders
 Rhys Buckley to  Bargoed
 Barney Nightingale  to  Bargoed
 Keagan Bale to  Bargoed
 Angus O'Brien to  Scarlets
 Nicky Thomas to  Scarlets (return from short-term loan)
 Dorian Jones to  Angoulême
 Charlie Davies to  Northampton Saints
 Lloyd Lewis to  Pontypool
 Sam Beard to  Canterbury
 Thomas Davies to  Cardiff
 Ashley Sweet to  Ebbw Vale
 Liam Belcher to  Cardiff Blues
 Robson Blake retired
 Carl Meyer to  Ebbw Vale
 Sam Hobbs to  Merthyr
 James Thomas released

Edinburgh

Players In
 John Barclay from  Scarlets
 Simon Hickey from  Bordeaux
 Matt Scott from  Gloucester
 Juan Pablo Socino from  Newcastle Falcons
 David Cherry from  Stade Niçois
 Pietro Ceccarelli from  Oyonnax
 Pierre Schoeman from 
 Senitiki Nayalo from  London Irish
 Luke Hamilton from  Leicester Tigers
 Henry Pyrgos from  Glasgow Warriors
 Jason Baggott promoted from Academy
 Charlie Shiel promoted from Academy
 George Taylor promoted from Academy

Players Out
 George Turner to  Glasgow Warriors
 Jordan Lay to  Bristol Bears
 Cornell du Preez to  Worcester Warriors
 Junior Rasolea to  Grenoble
 Neil Cochrane retired
 Duncan Weir to  Worcester Warriors
 Elliot Millar-Mills to  Ealing Trailfinders
 Sam Hidalgo-Clyne to  Scarlets
 Jason Harries to  Cardiff Blues
 Kevin Bryce  Glasgow Warriors
 Matt Shields retired
 Phil Burleigh to  Canterbury
 Robbie Fruean retired
 Callum McLelland to  Leeds Rhinos
 Alasdair Dickinson retired
 Glenn Bryce to  Watsonians
 Jason Tovey to  Dragons
 John Hardie to  Newcastle Falcons
 Tom Galbraith to  Northumbria University

Glasgow Warriors

Players In
 George Turner from  Edinburgh
 D. T. H. van der Merwe from  Newcastle Falcons
 David Tameilau from  Narbonne
 Nick Frisby from  Queensland Reds
 Robbie Nairn promoted from Academy
 Bruce Flockhart promoted from Academy
 Adam Nicol promoted from Academy
 Kevin Bryce from  Edinburgh
 Thomas Gordon from  Currie
 Andrew Davidson from  Newcastle Falcons (short-term deal)
 Petrus du Plessis from  London Irish

Players Out
  Finn Russell to  Racing 92
 Ryan Grant retired
 Pat MacArthur retired
 Richie Vernon to  London Scottish
 Lewis Wynne to  London Scottish (season-long loan)
 Henry Pyrgos to  Edinburgh
 Brian Alainu'uese to  Toulon
 Greg Peterson to  Bordeaux
 Leonardo Sarto to  Leicester Tigers
 Alex Dunbar to  Newcastle Falcons

Leinster

Players In
 Jordan Larmour promoted from Academy
 Vakh Abdaladze promoted from Academy
 Caelan Doris promoted from Academy
 Josh Murphy promoted from Academy
 Joe Tomane from  Montpellier
 Will Connors promoted from Academy

Players Out
 Jordi Murphy to  Ulster
 Jamie Heaslip retired
 Isa Nacewa retired
 Richardt Strauss retired
 Oisin Heffernan to  Nottingham
 Peadar Timmins retired
 Joey Carbery to  Munster
 Cathal Marsh to  Rugby United New York

Munster

Players In
 Tadhg Beirne from  Scarlets
 Calvin Nash promoted from Academy
 Liam O'Connor promoted from Academy
 Fineen Wycherley promoted from Academy
 Mike Haley from  Sale Sharks
 Neil Cronin from  Garryowen
 Arno Botha from  London Irish
 Joey Carbery from  Leinster
 Alby Mathewson from  Toulon (short-term deal)
 Cronan Gleeson from  Old Wesley (short-term deal)

Players Out
 Simon Zebo to  Racing 92
 Robin Copeland to  Connacht
 David Johnston to  Ealing Trailfinders
 Gerbrandt Grobler to  Gloucester
 Stephen Fitzgerald to  Connacht (three-month loan)
 Ian Keatley to  London Irish (short-term deal)
 Mike Sherry to  Gloucester (loan)
 Ronan O'Mahony retired

Ospreys

Players In
 Scott Williams from  Scarlets
 Aled Davies from  Scarlets
 Lesley Klim from  Doncaster Knights
 Tom Botha from  Cheetahs
 George North from  Northampton Saints
 Gheorghe Gajion from  Trelissac
 Guido Volpi from  Narbonne
 Giorgi Nemsadze from  Bristol Bears
 Luke Morgan from  Wales Sevens
 Johnny Kôtze from  Bulls (short-term deal)

Players Out
 Brian Mujati retired
 Dan Biggar to  Northampton Saints
 Rhys Webb to  Toulon
 Kieron Fonotia to  Scarlets
 Ashley Beck to  Worcester Warriors
 Ben John sabbatical
 Eli Walker retired
 Rowan Jenkins to  Yorkshire Carnegie
 Dafydd Howells to  Dragons
 Hugh Gustafson retired
 Dmitri Arhip to  Cardiff Blues
 Rory Thornton to  Cardiff Blues (season-long loan)
 Jeff Hassler retired
 Brendon Leonard to  Taranaki
 Jay Baker to  Merthyr
 Paul James retired

Scarlets

Players In
 Kieron Fonotia from  Ospreys
 Blade Thomson from  Hurricanes
 Uzair Cassiem from  Cheetahs
 Clayton Blommetjies from  Cheetahs
 Phil Price from  Dragons
 Sam Hidalgo-Clyne from  Edinburgh
 Kieran Hardy from  Jersey Reds
 Angus O'Brien from  Dragons
 Ed Kennedy from  Randwick
 Matthew Davies from  Neath
 Marc Jones from  Sale Sharks

Players Out
 Tadhg Beirne to  Munster
 John Barclay to  Edinburgh
 Scott Williams to  Ospreys
 Aled Davies to  Ospreys
 Billy McBryde to  RGC 1404
 Jack Condy retired
 Tom Grabham retired
 Emyr Phillips retired
 Tom Varndell to  Angoulême
 Geraint Rhys Jones to  Ebbw Vale
 Nicky Thomas to  Bargoed
 Tom Williams to  Cardiff Blues

Southern Kings

Players In
 Sarel Pretorius from  Dragons
 Meli Rokoua from  AEIS Agronomia
 JC Astle from  Mont-de-Marsan
 Schalk Oelofse from  Mont-de-Marsan
 Tertius Kruger from  Cheetahs
 Ulrich Beyers from  
 Bjorn Basson from  Oyonnax
 Lupumlo Mguca from  
 Brandon Brown from  
 Stephan de Wit from  
 Ruan van Rensburg from  Cheetahs
 Michael Botha from  
 Xandré Vos from  
 Stefan Ungerer from 
 Alulutho Tshakweni from 
 Bader Pretorius from 
 Courtney Winnaar from

Players Out
 Piet-Louw Strauss to  Maties
 Rowan Gouws to  Eastern Province Elephants
 JP Smith to  Eastern Province Elephants
 Joe Smith to  Leopards
 Njabulo Gumede to  Free State XV
 Anthony Volmink to  Golden Lions XV
 Jacques Nel to  Aurillac
 Alshaun Bock to  SWD Eagles
 Kurt Coleman injured
 Dayan van der Westhuizen to  Blue Bulls XV
 Entienne Swanepoel to  Valsugana
 Eital Bredenkamp to  Griquas
 JC Roos retired
 Siya Mdaka to  Leopards
 Freddy Ngoza to  
 Victor Sekekete to  
 Lusanda Badiyana to  
 Tristan Blewett to  New Orleans Gold
 Stephan Coetzee to  Seattle Seawolves
 Lindokuhle Welemu not named
 Khaya Majola not named
 Luzuko Vulindlu not named
 Godlen Masimla to 

Ulster

Players In
 Marty Moore from  Wasps
 Jordi Murphy from  Leinster
 Nick Timoney promoted from Academy
 Will Addison from  Sale Sharks
 Alexander Thompson from  Terenure
 Billy Burns from  Gloucester
 Greg Jones promoted from Academy
 Adam McBurney promoted from Academy
 Johnny Stewart promoted from Academy
 Alan Bennie from  Lansdowne
 Henry Speight from  Brumbies (short-term deal)
 Angus Curtis promoted from Academy
 Tom O'Toole promoted from Academy
 Ian Nagle from  Leinster (loan deal)

Players Out
 Charles Piutau to  Bristol Bears
 Tommy Bowe retired
 Callum Black to  Worcester Warriors
 Brett Herron to  Jersey Reds
 Paul Marshall retired
 Callum Patterson to  Cornish Pirates
 Andrew Trimble retired
 Stuart Olding to  Brive
 Jared Payne retired
 Paddy Jackson to  Perpignan
 Aaron Cairns to  Ballynahinch
 Peter Browne retired
 Jean Deysel retired
 Chris Henry retired
 Rodney Ah You to  Newcastle Falcons
 Robbie Diack released
 Schalk van der Merwe released
 Wiehahn Herbst to  Bulls

Zebre

Players In
 Edoardo Padovani from  Toulon
 Nicolas De Battista from  Cornish Pirates
 Massimo Ceciliani from  Viadana
 Samuele Ortis from  Rovigo Delta
 Giovanni Licata from  Fiamme Oro
 Giosuè Zilocchi from  Calvisano
 Daniele Rimpelli from  Calvisano
 Jimmy Tuivaiti from  Calvisano
 Paula Balekana from  Sydney Rays
 Apisai Tauyavuca from  Fijian Drua
 Matu Tevi from  North Harbour
 Francois Brummer from  Bulls
 Jamie Elliot from  Bedford Blues
 James Brown from  Northern Suburbs
 Josh Renton from  Otago
 Marco Ciccioli from  CASI

Players Out
 James Tucker to  Waikato
 Failaga Afamasaga to  Colorno
 Andrea Manici retired 
 Andrea De Marchi to  I Medicei
 Valerio Bernabò retired 
 Jacopo Sarto to  Colorno
 Rory Parata to  Cornish Pirates
 Matteo Pratichetti retired 
 Serafin Bordoli to  Olivos
 Ciaran Gaffney retired
 Derick Minnie retired
 Tommaso D'Apice retired
 Sami Panico released

See also
List of 2018–19 Premiership Rugby transfers
List of 2018–19 RFU Championship transfers
List of 2018–19 Super Rugby transfers
List of 2018–19 Top 14 transfers
List of 2018-19 Major League Rugby transfers

References

2018–19 Pro14
2018-19